Mimi Hill (born 4 October 2002) is an Australian rules footballer playing for  in the AFL Women's (AFLW).

Early life
Hill played junior football for the Kew Comets in the Yarra Junior Football League for around three years. Hill spent two years playing for the Old Scotch Football Club, where was named best on ground while playing for them in the Victorian Amateur Football Association for the premiership. Cited as a natural leader from a young age, Hill was appointed the captain of the Oakleigh Chargers in her bottom age year. She played 10 games in her first season at the Chargers, where she averaged 16.8 disposals, and 2 in her second, where she averaged 24.5 disposals, only playing 2 due to the impact of the COVID-19 pandemic. She represented Vic Metro in the Under 16s championships and 2019 AFL Women's Under 18 Championships. She played two games for Vic Metro in 2019, where she averaged 25 disposals a game.

Hill attended Methodist Ladies College in Kew, Victoria, where she was appointed school captain in both Year 11 and Year 12.

AFLW career
On debut, she collected 12 disposals, 2 marks and a tackle. Hill injured her knee in Round 6.

Statistics  
Statistics are correct to the end of the 2021 season. 

|- 
| scope="row" text-align:center | 2021
| 
| 10 || 6 || 2 || 0 || 26 || 48 || 74 || 8 || 5 || 0.3 || 0.0 || 4.3 || 8.0 || 12.3 || 1.3 || 0.8 || 
|- class="sortbottom"
! colspan=3 | Career
! 6
! 2
! 0
! 26
! 48
! 74
! 8
! 5
! 0.3
! 0.0 
! 4.3
! 8.0
! 12.3
! 1.3
! 0.8
! 0
|}

References

External links

2002 births
Living people
 Carlton Football Club (AFLW) players
Oakleigh Chargers players (NAB League Girls)
Australian rules footballers from Victoria (Australia)
People educated at Methodist Ladies' College, Melbourne